Clint Stitser (born May 19, 1985) is a former American football placekicker. He was signed by the New York Jets as an undrafted free agent in 2010. He played college football at Fresno State. Stitser was also a member of the Seattle Seahawks, Cincinnati Bengals, Washington Redskins and Las Vegas Locomotives. He is currently a real estate broker in Reno, Nevada.

College career
Stitser played college football for the Fresno State Bulldogs from 2003–2007. He made 71% of his field goals in his college career.

Professional career

New York Jets
Stitser went undrafted in the 2008 NFL Draft. He was signed by the New York Jets on April 6, 2010, but was waived on June 1.

Seattle Seahawks
He signed with the Seattle Seahawks on August 17 and played in one preseason game for the Seahawks. He made a 35-yard field goal in the game, and converted all three extra point attempts. He was waived on August 31.

Cincinnati Bengals
On November 30, he was signed by the Cincinnati Bengals, replacing ineffective starter Aaron Pettrey.

Washington Redskins
Stitser signed with the Washington Redskins on August 17, 2011, but was waived on August 30.

Las Vegas Locomotives
Stitser played for the Las Vegas Locomotives of the United Football League during the 2011 and 2012 seasons.

References

External links
Just Sports Stats
Cincinnati Bengals bio
Seattle Seahawks bio
Fresno State Bulldogs football bio

1985 births
Living people
Sportspeople from Reno, Nevada
Players of American football from Nevada
American football placekickers
Fresno State Bulldogs football players
New York Jets players
Seattle Seahawks players
Cincinnati Bengals players
Washington Redskins players
Las Vegas Locomotives players